Pratt & Whitney Canada (PWC or P&WC) is a Canada-based aircraft engine manufacturer.  PWC's headquarters are in Longueuil, Quebec, just outside Montreal.  It is a division of the larger US-based Pratt & Whitney (P&W), itself a business unit of Raytheon Technologies Corporation. United Technologies has given PWC a world mandate for small and medium aircraft engines while P&W's US operations develop and manufacture larger engines.

Although PWC is a division of P&W, it does its own research, development and marketing as well as the manufacturing of its engines. The company currently has about 10,000 employees worldwide, with 6,000 of them in Canada.

History
The Canadian Pratt & Whitney Aircraft Company, Ltd. was founded in November 1928 to act as a service centre for P&W aircraft engines. During World War II, it assembled Pratt & Whitney Wasp series engines built in the U.S. In 1952, the production of Wasp engines was transferred to Canadian Pratt & Whitney so P&W could concentrate on developing jet engines.

In the late 1950s, a team of 12 Canadian Pratt & Whitney engineers began the development of the first small turbine engine in Canada, the PT6.  The first example was delivered to a customer in 1963. In 1962, the company was renamed United Aircraft of Canada (UAC), and assumed its current name in 1975. In 1963 a total of 41 Sikorsky CH-124 Sea King (originally CHSS-2) helicopters were delivered to the Royal Canadian Navy. The airframe components were made in Connecticut by another United Aircraft subsidiary, Sikorsky, but most of the aircraft were assembled by UAC in Longueuil, Quebec.

Its 100,000th engine was produced in May 2017, its fleet logged 730 million flight hours and 60,000 in-service engines are operated by 12,300 customers in more than 200 countries.

Products

Engines

Next Generation Regional Turboprop

The high-efficiency compressor testing began in 2012 and ran the full range of aerodynamic design points to validate the component efficiency and pressure ratio.
Compressor tests were successfully completed in 2016 and Hot-section technology was to be adapted from the PW1000G. PWC targeted 2023-25 for its introduction, and it was to halve operating cost per shaft horsepower.

Aircraft
 Sikorsky CH-124 Sea King - primary assembly

Fleet
As of February 2023, Pratt & Whitney Canada has the following aircraft registered with Transport Canada and operate as ICAO airline designator PWC, and telephony PRATT.

 Boeing 747SP - 2
 Cessna 560XLS - 1
 De Havilland Canada Dash 8 - 1
 Dornier 328JET (328-300) - 1

References

Footnotes

Notes

External links
 

1928 establishments in Quebec
Aircraft engine manufacturers of Canada
Canadian subsidiaries of foreign companies
Companies based in Longueuil
Defence companies of Canada
Gas turbine manufacturers
Manufacturing companies established in 1928
 
Raytheon Technologies
Technology companies established in 1928
United Technologies